The Pecineaga or Peceneaga is a left tributary of the river Slănic in Romania. It discharges into the Slănic in Vintilă Vodă. The following villages are situated along the river Pecineaga, from source to mouth: Băltăgari, Sările, Sărulești, Cărătnău de Jos and Vintilă Vodă.

References

Rivers of Romania
Rivers of Buzău County